George Leonard Wallace known as George Wallace Jnr (16 May 1918 – 30 September 1968), was an Australian comedian, vaudevillian, and television personality. The son of George Stephenson Wallace, he became a famous comedian in his own right. He had considerable success on television in the late 1950s, and 1960s, winning Logie Awards in 1963 and 1964. George Wallace Jnr's television show, Theatre Royal, which originated in Brisbane, won six consecutive Logie Awards from 1962 to 1967.

Early and personal life
George Leonard Wallace was born in Walkerston, Queensland to George Stevenson "Onkus" Wallace, a comedian, and Margarita Edith Emma, née Nicholas. His father was a well-known comedian, and George junior appeared at age three on stage in Sydney with his father.
Wallace married Marjorie Bruce-Clarke on 10 January 1945 at St Philip's Church of England, Sydney. He died of cerebrovascular disease on 30 September 1968 at Southport, Queensland.

Professional career
Wallace worked the Tivoli circuit in Australia and New Zealand. On 27 December 1948 Wallace started at the Theatre Royal in Brisbane, a ten-week engagement extended to a decade; his four thousand performances at the Royal in revue and pantomime were considered at the time to be a world record for a comedian.

See also 
 The Contact Show
 The George Wallace Show
 Theatre Royal
 George Wallace Memorial Logie for Best New Talent

References

External links
 

1918 births
1968 deaths
20th-century Australian comedians
Australian male comedians
Logie Award winners
People from Queensland